Vikram Chatterjee is an Indian actor of Bengali cinema. He made his big screen debut with a small role in Mainak Bhowmik's 2012 movie Bedroom and was immediately noticed. In the same year he acted in Bappaditya Bandopadhyay's Elar Char Adhyay based on Rabindranath Tagore's last novel Char Adhyay as a lead. Soon after he acted in Ami Aar Amar Girlfriends, Hoichoi, Britto. He has gained immense popularity from his daily soap Ichchenodi where he played the lead character, Anurag and enjoys a huge fan base, thanks to the success of the show.  Vikram has earned a lot of accolades for his film "Shaheb Bibi Golaam", where the whole industry has taken notice of his brilliant portrayal of Zico. In 2013, he participated in the reality show Bigg Boss Bangla as a contestant.

As described by Calcutta Times, he is "Tellyland's" hottest man and 5th among most desirable men in 2017. Vikram has been the heartthrob for many in the recent years and has been loved for many of his performances especially in the recent past.

His film Khoj directed by Arko Ganguly and Meghnad Badh Rahasya directed by Anik Dutta have been critically acclaimed and successful at the box office as well.

Works

Filmography

Television

Advertisements/Commercials 
 Anjali Jewellers Directed by Anik Dutta
 Snapdeal
 Mahindra Centuro
 Vivo India Directed by Vinil Mathew
 Shoppers Stop
 Amazon (company)

Web series

Awards and nominations

Controversy 
On 29 April 2017 at 3.30 am Vikram and his friend Sonika Chauhan a model, actress and a TV Host, was driving back home from a party and met with an accident at Rashbehari Avenue connector near Lake mall. Both were taken to the hospital where Sonika was declared dead by the doctors due to severe head injuries and Vikram was injured. He was treated at Ruby General Hospital and was later discharged on 4 May 2017. A police case was launched against Vikram. Initially he was absconding after the police had charged him with culpable homicide not amounting to murder as well as rash and negligent driving. Later, he was arrested by the Kolkata Police on 6 July. Thereafter a court granted him bail on 26 July 2017.

References

External links 
 

1988 births
Living people
Male actors from West Bengal
Bengali male television actors
Male actors in Bengali cinema
21st-century Indian male actors
Indian male film actors
Indian male television actors
Bigg Boss Bangla contestants